Ralph Nixon Currey (14 December 1907 – 18 November 2001) was a South African born poet, who wrote in English.

Life
He was born in Mafeking, South Africa, the son of John Currey (1871–1959) and his wife Edith Vinnicombe (1881–1959). His father was an English Methodist minister who had come out with the British troops at the end of the Second Anglo-Boer War. He attended Kingswood School, Bath and Wadham College, Oxford. Currey married Stella Martin in 1932.  He taught at Colchester Royal Grammar School from 1934 to 1973.

Currey was called up in 1941 to the Royal Corps of Signals before transferring to the Royal Artillery where he received his commission. In 1945 T. S. Eliot wrote to him about his work This Other Planet, telling him that he thought it was "the best war poetry in the correct sense of the term that I have seen in these past years".

Currey died at home in Colchester, England.

Works 
 Tiresias, Oxford University, 1940
 Heavy Guns, New English Weekly, 1942
 The Poetry Magazine July 1944
 This Other Planet, 1945
 Poems from India (Bombay, 1945) (London, 1946)
 Indian Landscape, Routledge, 1947
 Formal Spring, OUP, 1950
 Poets of the 1939-1945 War, British Council, 1951 (Longmans, 1967)
 Letters of a Natal sheriff: Thomas Phipson, 1969
 The Africa We Knew, David Philip, 1973
 Vinnicombe's Trek, 1989
 Collected Poems, James Currey publishers, 2001

References 

1907 births
2001 deaths
People from Mahikeng
Royal Corps of Signals soldiers
Royal Artillery officers
English male poets
South African writers
20th-century English poets
20th-century English male writers
British Army personnel of World War II